Jonte "Too Tall" Hall (born July 2, 1982) is an American basketball player for the Harlem Globetrotters.

References

External links
 Harlem Globetrotters: Too Tall Hall

1982 births
Living people
American men's basketball players
Basketball players from Baltimore
Community College of Baltimore County alumni
Harlem Globetrotters players
Junior college men's basketball players in the United States
Washington Generals players